Ukraine made its Paralympic Games début at the 1996 Summer Paralympics in Atlanta, with thirty athletes competing in archery, track and field, powerlifting, swimming, and sitting volleyball. Vasyl Lishchynskyy won Ukraine's first Paralympic gold medal, in the shot put, and Ukrainians also won four silver medals and two bronze. Ukrainians had previously participated within the Soviet Union's delegation in 1988, and as part of the Unified Team in 1992. Ukraine, following its independence from the Soviet Union, missed out on the 1994 Winter Games, but made its Winter Paralympics début at the 1998 Winter Games in Nagano. Ukraine has competed at every edition of the Summer and Winter Games since then and have done so with remarkable success.

Paralympic success
Competing as an independent country since 1996, Ukrainian athletes have won a total of 238 Paralympic medals, of which 67 gold, 69 silver and 92 bronze, placing the country 23rd on the all-time Paralympic Games medal table. The country has won 173 medals at the Summer Games, and 65 at the Winter Games. It has won more gold medals, and more medals overall, than any other former member of the Soviet Union, apart from Russia.

In the 2000s, Ukraine became a major Paralympic power. While it had taken "only" seven medals at the 1996 Summer Games, it increased its tally to 37 in 2000, in Sydney. Though it won twenty silver medals at the Sydney Games, however, it won only three gold, and remained low-ranked on the overall medal chart. It ascended to the top ranks at the 2004 Games in Athens, sweeping up 55 medals, of which 24 gold, to finish sixth on the medal table. At the 2008 Games in Beijing, Ukrainians won 74 medals, of which 24 gold, and finished fourth – behind only China (1st), the United Kingdom (2nd) and the United States (3rd).

Ukraine has also been highly successful at the Winter Paralympics, its best result coming at the 2022 Games in Beijing, where it won 29 medals (including 11 gold) to finish second behind hosts China.

Valeriy Sushkevych, a former disability swimmer turned politician and member of Parliament, has been credited with "kick-start[ing] the Paralympic movement in the country". He helped establish a national Paralympic centre in 2002, and ensured that Ukrainian Paralympians were granted a specific budget, which sports official Karina Matiazh said was Ukraine's "biggest achievement. [...] [W]e have separate budgets for the Olympics and the Paralympics, whereas most other countries just get whatever bits and pieces are left over from their Olympic budget". Four-time Paralympic swimming champion Maksym Veraksa described Sushkevych as "a father figure" concerned with "each and every athlete".

Lviv Today noted in 2010 that "Ukraine’s Paralympic team has experienced a major boost in the amount of training and support it receives in recent years", resulting in "extraordinary" progress at the Winter Games in particular: "[F]rom finishing 18th in Salt Lake City in 2002, Ukraine rose to 3rd (2nd in terms of actual number of medals won) in Turin in 2006". The China Daily in 2008 remarked that, in terms of the proportion of its medals in relation to the number of its athletes, Ukraine was "clearly punching above its weight". New Disability notes: "The only country which has consistently been amongst the top medal winners in both recent summer and winter Paralympic Games is Ukraine. This is due to a major strategy by Ukraine to support Paralympic Athletes".

Among Ukraine's most successful athletes is Viktor Smyrnov, who won five gold medals (as well as a silver and a bronze) in swimming (disability category 11) at the 2004 Summer Games. Ukraine also won the men's football 7-a-side competition at the 2004 Games, and successfully defended their title in 2008. Ukrainians have, in addition, won gold medals in track and field, cross-country skiing and biathlon, as well as one in powerlifting in 2004 (Lidiya Solovyova in the women's up to 40 kg) and one in wheelchair fencing that same year (Andriy Komar in the men's épée individual, category B).

Medals

Source:

Medals by Summer Games

Medals by Winter Games

Medals by summer sport

Medals by winter sport

See also
 Ukraine at the Olympics

References